Digdoh is a census town in Nagpur district  in the state of Maharashtra, India.

Demographics 
 India census, Digdoh had a population of 38,157. Males constitute 56% of the population and females 44%. Digdoh has an average literacy rate of 77%, higher than the national average of 59.5%: male literacy is 82% and, female literacy is 71%. In Digdoh, 15% of the population is under 6 years of age.

References 

Cities and towns in Nagpur district